Thomas Jacob may refer to:

Thomas Jacob (designer) (born 1984), Italian fashion designer
Thomas Jacob (journalist), Malayalam journalist
Thomas Jacob (luger) (born 1965), East German luger
Thomas Jacob (MP) (c. 1653–1730), Member of Parliament for Wootton Basset, 1695–1698

See also 
 Thomas Jacobs (disambiguation)